Maryam Yusuf Jamal  (born Zenebech Tola) (born 16 September 1984) is an Ethiopian-born Bahraini middle-distance runner. She is the first Bahraini athlete to win an Olympic medal, a gold (originally bronze, but later upgraded after two doping violations) in the 1500m women's race, in the 2012 Summer Olympics in London. This was also the first Olympic medal won by a woman representing a Gulf state.
Born in Ethiopia, 2005 was her first full season. She gained the national record and ran the fastest 3000 m of the year, with a time of 8:28.87 at a race in Oslo. Jamal is a two-time world champion in the 1500 m, having won at the 2007 and 2009 World Championships in Athletics.

She represented Bahrain at the 2008 Summer Olympics in Beijing, finishing fifth in the 1500 m final. Jamal has also had much success at regional competitions: winning two gold medals at the 2006 Asian Games in addition to the Asian Cross Country Championships in both 2007 and 2009.

Early life and transfer 
Jamal was born in the Arsi Zone in the Oromia Region of Ethiopia, an area famous for distance runners, including Haile Gebrselassie, Kenenisa Bekele and Tirunesh Dibaba. She is Muslim,  and is of Oromo background.

Jamal later left Ethiopia with her husband, Tariq Yaqoob, due partially to political and economic problems. She had run a qualifying time for the 2004 Summer Olympics, but was allegedly refused permission to represent her home country by the Ethiopian Athletic Federation due to the competition in the country as well as politics.

In 2004, she and her husband sought political asylum in Lausanne, Switzerland. She applied for multiple citizenship papers before Bahrain granted them to her that same year. First, she applied for citizenship in the US, Canada and France. Bahrain, eager to gain a sporting image, granted this in exchange that she change her name to an Arabic one and that she compete in the Asian Games in Doha, Qatar in 2006.

Based in Lausanne, Jamal often trains at altitude in St. Moritz. She is trained by her husband Tariq Yaqoob (who was Mnashu Taye before being granted Bahraini citizenship with his wife).

Competing for Bahrain

She ran at the 2005 World Championships in Athletics, but was obstructed in the final, which resulted in the disqualification of the silver medallist Yuliya Chizhenko. She beat the event winner, Tatyana Tomashova, soon afterwards to take the gold at the 2005 IAAF World Athletics Final. After a bronze medal performance at the 2006 IAAF World Indoor Championships, Jamal beat Tomashova twice more at major events the following year, bringing Asia victory in the 1500 m at the 2006 IAAF World Cup and winning at the 2006 IAAF World Athletics Final. She closed the year with an 800/1500 m double at the 2006 Asian Games.

She turned her skills to cross country running at the start of 2007: she took first place at the Cinque Mulini and went on to win the individual and team gold medals at the Asian Cross Country Championships. At the 2007 World Championships in Athletics in Osaka, Jamal passed Yelena Soboleva in the last 200 metres to win the women's 1500 metres, winning the only gold medal for Bahrain. She made it a third consecutive World Final victory at the 2007 IAAF World Athletics Final, finishing ahead of Soboleva (who was later disqualified for switching urine samples to avoid drug testing).

At the start of the next season, she competed at the 2008 IAAF World Indoor Championships and ran a close indoor 1500 m against Gelete Burka. Sobeleva set a world record for the victory but was later stripped of the title. Burka was elevated to gold while Jamal gained the silver medal, which she won in an Asian record time of 3:59.79. She did not build on her World Championship success with an Olympic medal as she finished fifth in the 1500 metres at the 2008 Beijing Olympics. Another win at the 2008 IAAF World Athletics Final closed the year.

Jamal became the first female athlete to win twice at the Asian Cross Country Championships, taking her second gold and competing in Bahrain for the first time. She ran at the 2009 IAAF World Cross Country Championships at finished ninth overall. Making up for her Olympic defeat, she defended her world title on the track with a win at the 2009 World Championships in Athletics, just staying ahead of Lisa Dobriskey at the finish line. A fourth-place finish at the 2009 IAAF World Athletics Final brought an end to a successful season.

In 2010, Jamal competed on the inaugural Diamond League circuit, including a second-place finish behind Sentayehu Ejigu at the Herculis meeting. Later that season, she ran at the 2010 Asian Games and managed to retain her title over 1500 m. She later opened her 2011 with a win at the Eurocross, following on from compatriot Mimi Belete's win the previous year.

In the 2012 Summer Olympics in London, Jamal placed third in the 1500m race, finishing in 4:10:74, behind Asli Cakir Alptekin and Gamze Bulut, both of Turkey. Alptekin was later given an eight-year ban for biological passport violations, a doping related offense, and stripped of her gold medal. Gamze Bulut was also later suspended for biological passport irregularities and was stripped of her silver medal on March 29, 2017. Four of the other finishers in the first nine finishers have also been linked to performance-enhancing drugs.

Belated Olympic Gold for 2012 London Olympics

In November 2017, Maryam Yusuf Jamal was advanced to the gold medal, although the IOC has yet to determine what to do with the silver and bronze medal due to doping violations of the original 4th and 5th place finishers, and numerous other finalists.  Eventually the silver and bronze medals were controversially awarded to past drug users, but people who not been found to be doping at the actual London Olympics.

Controversy 
After winning the 3000 m in Oslo on July 14, 2005, her image was published throughout the international sporting press. Her outfit of short shorts and a sleeveless midriff bearing top caused a minor outrage in Bahrain led by MP Hamad Al-Muhannadi. In 2004, Bahraini champion Ruqaya Al Ghasra competed in the Athens Olympics fully covered.  Bahrain Athletics Association vice-president Mohammed Jamal said the association was already planning to give new sportswear to Ms Jamal, which covered her stomach and her legs down to the knee. However comments by Mohammed Jamal show that to be unlikely to actually occur.

Personal bests

See also
List of Olympic medalists in athletics (women)
List of 2012 Summer Olympics medal winners
List of World Athletics Championships medalists (women)
List of IAAF World Indoor Championships medalists (women)
List of Asian Games medalists in athletics
List of eligibility transfers in athletics 
Outline of Bahrain
1500 metres at the Olympics
1500 metres at the World Championships in Athletics

References

External links

 Article and picture of Maryam Yusuf Jamal

1984 births
Living people
Sportspeople from Oromia Region
Ethiopian emigrants to Bahrain
Naturalized citizens of Bahrain
Bahraini Muslims
Ethiopian Muslims
Oromo people
Bahraini people of Ethiopian descent
Bahraini female middle-distance runners
Bahraini female long-distance runners
Bahraini female cross country runners
Ethiopian female middle-distance runners
Ethiopian female long-distance runners
Ethiopian female cross country runners
Olympic female middle-distance runners
Olympic athletes of Bahrain
Olympic gold medalists for Bahrain
Olympic gold medalists in athletics (track and field)
Athletes (track and field) at the 2008 Summer Olympics
Athletes (track and field) at the 2012 Summer Olympics
Medalists at the 2012 Summer Olympics
Asian Games gold medalists for Bahrain
Asian Games gold medalists in athletics (track and field)
Athletes (track and field) at the 2006 Asian Games
Athletes (track and field) at the 2010 Asian Games
Athletes (track and field) at the 2014 Asian Games
Medalists at the 2006 Asian Games
Medalists at the 2010 Asian Games
Medalists at the 2014 Asian Games
World Athletics Championships athletes for Bahrain
World Athletics Championships winners
World Athletics Championships medalists
Asian Cross Country Championships winners